"Say It" is a song by Australian musician Flume, featuring the vocals from Swedish singer and songwriter Tove Lo. The track was released as the third single from his second studio album, Skin. It was premiered on Annie Mac's BBC Radio 1 show on 20 April 2016 and released on 22 April 2016, by Australian label Future Classic. The song performed successfully in Oceania, peaking at number five on the ARIA Singles Chart and number four on the RMNZ Singles Chart.

Background 
In an interview, Flume told Annie Mac that he was inspired to work with Lo after hearing her song "Habits (Stay High)" in a bar in Los Angeles following a Kanye West show. He contacted her the next day, and the two were able to write the song in two days.

Tove Lo adds, "I was in LA for a few days between tours when Harley [Flume] reached out to me about writing together. I've been a big fan of him for a long time so I pretty much ran over to his studio. He played me some ideas which one of them was the track for "Say It", and I just started vibing melodies over it and we put together something we loved. It was so relaxed and fun and kind of a new way for me to write. Very excited for people to hear it!" The song was written in the key of E Minor (recorded in D# Minor) and runs at a moderately fast tempo of 150 BPM.

Critical reception
Billboard said, "'Say It' is a slower jam that embraces a highly sexual side of the duo, as Tove Lo sings of heartbreak and emotions that are overpowered by rising carnal temptations – 'break my bed to make me want to stay.' It's a relatable breakup story of a painful relationship that's stuck on repeat, complemented by a melodic chorus and soft beats."

Track listings
 Digital download
 "Say It" – 4:22

 Clean Bandit remix
 "Say It"  – 5:30

Charts

Weekly charts

Year-end charts

Certifications

Release history

References

2016 songs
2016 singles
Flume (musician) songs
Future bass songs
Future Classic singles
Mom + Pop Music singles
Song recordings produced by Flume (musician)
Songs written by Daniel Johns
Songs written by Flume (musician)
Songs written by Tove Lo
Trip hop songs
Tove Lo songs